Mark Linden Lee is a former Major League Baseball pitcher. Lee pitched in all or part of four seasons from  until , the first two for the San Diego Padres and the last two for the Pittsburgh Pirates. He was general manager of the Amarillo Dillas and subsequently the Amarillo Sox of the American Association of Independent Professional Baseball from 2006 to 2014.

References

Sources
, or Retrosheet, or Pura Pelota

1953 births
Living people
Amarillo Gold Sox players
Baseball players from Inglewood, California
El Camino College alumni
El Camino Warriors baseball players
Evansville Triplets players
Hawaii Islanders players
Major League Baseball pitchers
Pepperdine University alumni
Pepperdine Waves baseball players
Pittsburgh Pirates players
Portland Beavers players
San Diego Padres players
Tigres de Aragua players
American expatriate baseball players in Venezuela
Walla Walla Padres players